Alexander Emenike  (born 22 January 1989), formerly known as Alex Nkume, is a Nigerian association football player, who last played as a central defender for VVV-Venlo.

Career 
Emenike began his career in the youth side with Enugu Rangers who was promoted in January 2007 to the Nigerian Premier League team and joined on 31 July 2009 on trial to VVV-Venlo.

International career 
He is also current member of the Nigeria national under-20 football team and represented the team at 2009 African Youth Championship, formerly played with the team the WAFU Cup 2008. He was in the Trainings camp squad for the 2009 FIFA U-20 World Cup squads he was not call up for the tournament.

References

1989 births
Living people
Nigerian footballers
Rangers International F.C. players
Eredivisie players
Nigerian expatriate footballers
Expatriate footballers in the Netherlands
Nigerian expatriate sportspeople in the Netherlands
VVV-Venlo players
Association football defenders
Footballers from Enugu